Mountainview High School is a co-educational state high school in Timaru, New Zealand. The school runs from year nine to thirteen. The school has a roll of  more than 20 are International students.

The school operates a house system, known as Whānau. The three Whānau – "Hiwi", "Moana", and "Whenua" – compete throughout the year for the Preen Shield. 

Mountainview has a 2 hectare farmlet attached, as well as a small orchard and beehives. Students rear bobby calves and poultry, as well as carry out basic plant propagation.

History
Mountainview High School was founded in 1901, and was originally named Timaru Technical College, and later Timaru College. In 1983 the school relocated to the current Pages Road site and was renamed Mountainview High School. The Timaru Technical College site became Aoraki Polytechnic.

An adjacent site was also purchased by the Ministry of Education for a new 'Timaru North Intermediate' to coincide with Watlington Intermediate in the south of Timaru. After school numbers began to decline the plan was abandoned, and Watlington Intermediate closed in late 2004.

In 2005, Mountainview faced a merger alongside many other secondary schools within the proximity of the South Canterbury District due to educational changes as discussed with Education Minister of New Zealand, Trevor Mallard. Despite the unpopularity of this decision to close down schools to save taxpayer money, many had to comply with governing rule. This resulted in students from other secondary schools (namely Pleasant Point High School) to transfer to Mountainview and integrate with the students already in attendance at Mountainview High School.

References

External links
Education Review Office (ERO) reports

Educational institutions established in 1901
Secondary schools in Canterbury, New Zealand
Timaru
1901 establishments in New Zealand